Pierre Gaudin (1908–1973), son of Jean Gaudin (1879–1954) and grandson of Félix Gaudin (1851–1930) was a glass painter and mosaic artist. His studio executed mosaic designs and stained-glass windows for the Basilica of St. Thérèse, Lisieux. Gaudin had a daughter, Sylvie Gaudin and Catherine Aboulian

Notes

1908 births
1973 deaths
Mosaic artists
French glass artists
20th-century French painters
20th-century French male artists
French male painters